Perpignan station (French: Gare de Perpignan) is the railway station serving the city of Perpignan, Pyrénées-Orientales department, Occitanie, southern France. Part of the station was decorated in the style of Salvador Dalí, for whom the place held special significance, having proclaimed it to be the "Centre of the Universe" after experiencing a vision of cosmogonic ecstasy there in 1963 and made a painting called La Gare de Perpignan in 1965.

The station opened in 1858 and is located on the Narbonne–Portbou railway, LGV Perpignan–Figueres and Perpignan–Villefranche-de-Conflent railway. The station is served by TGV, Intercités and TER services operated by SNCF.

Train services
The following services currently call at Perpignan:

High speed services (TGV) Paris–Nîmes–Montpellier–Béziers–Perpignan–Barcelona
High speed services (TGV) Paris–Nîmes–Montpellier–Béziers–Perpignan
High speed services (AVE) Lyon–Nîmes–Montpellier–Béziers–Perpignan–Barcelona
High speed services (TGV) Toulouse–Carcassonne–Perpignan–Barcelona
High speed services (AVE) Marseille–Nîmes–Montpellier–Béziers–Perpignan–Barcelona–Madrid
Night services (Intercités de nuit) Paris–Carcassonne–Narbonne–Cerbère
Express service (TER Occitanie) Portbou–Cerbère–Perpignan–Narbonne–Béziers–Montpellier–Nîmes–Avignon
Local service (TER Occitanie) Portbou–Cerbère–Perpignan–Narbonne–Toulouse
Local service (TER Occitanie) Villefranche-Vernet-les-Bains–Perpignan

See also 

 List of SNCF stations in Occitanie

References

Railway stations in Pyrénées-Orientales
Railway stations in France opened in 1858